Rúben Manuel Pereira Alves (born 19 March 1995) is a Portuguese professional footballer who plays as a midfielder.

References

External links

Stats and profile at LPFP 
National team data 

1995 births
Living people
Portuguese footballers
Association football forwards
Liga Portugal 2 players
Segunda Divisão players
F.C. Famalicão players
S.C. Braga B players
Portugal youth international footballers
Sportspeople from Vila Nova de Gaia